Jimmy Connors was the defending champion but lost in the semifinals to John McEnroe.

John McEnroe won the singles title at the 1984 Queen's Club Championships tennis tournament defeating compatriot Leif Shiras in the final 6–1, 3–6, 6–2.

Seeds

  John McEnroe (champion)
  Ivan Lendl (first round)
  Jimmy Connors (semifinals)
  Yannick Noah (first round)
  Kevin Curren (third round)
  Bill Scanlon (first round)
  Tim Mayotte (quarterfinals)
  Chris Lewis (first round)
  Stefan Edberg (first round)
  Mel Purcell (second round)
  Scott Davis (second round)
  Henri Leconte (first round)
  Pat Cash (third round)
  Brian Gottfried (first round)
  Brian Teacher (third round)
  John Fitzgerald (second round)

Draw

Finals

Top half

Section 1

Section 2

Bottom half

Section 3

Section 4

References

External links
Official website Queen's Club Championships 
ATP tournament profile

Singles